Marcia Yuleisi Andrades Mendoza (born 17 May 1984 in Cumaná) is a Venezuelan freestyle wrestler. She competed in the freestyle 55 kg event at the 2012 Summer Olympics and was eliminated by Valeria Zholobova in the qualifications.  At the 2008 Olympics, she lost to Ludmila Cristea at the same stage. Andrades was born in Cumaná, Venezuela.

References

External links
 

1984 births
Living people
Venezuelan female sport wrestlers
Olympic wrestlers of Venezuela
Wrestlers at the 2008 Summer Olympics
Wrestlers at the 2012 Summer Olympics
People from Cumaná
Pan American Games bronze medalists for Venezuela
Pan American Games medalists in wrestling
Wrestlers at the 2003 Pan American Games
Medalists at the 2003 Pan American Games
21st-century Venezuelan women